Ameerega bilinguis, the Ecuador poison frog, is a species of frogs in the family Dendrobatidae found in Colombia, Ecuador, and possibly Peru.

Its natural habitats are subtropical or tropical moist lowland forests, rivers, intermittent rivers, freshwater marshes, and intermittent freshwater marshes. It is threatened by habitat loss.

The flashy and brilliant colors of this species constitutes a warning for its potential predators that its skin produces poison, a feature that makes it an undesirable food source. It is very common to hear the male singing from slightly elevated areas in search of a female. After the eggs hatch, the adults transport the tadpoles on their backs to ponds, where the tadpoles complete their development.

References

bilinguis
Amphibians of Ecuador
Amphibians of Colombia
Amphibians described in 1989
Taxonomy articles created by Polbot